Alexander Vladimirovich Gusev (21 January 1947 – 22 July 2020) was a Russian Soviet ice hockey player and Olympic champion. He participated at the 1976 Winter Olympics in Innsbruck, where the Soviet team won the gold  medal. He played the majority of his career with HC CSKA Moscow.

Gusev died on 22 July 2020 aged 73.

References

External links
 
 
 
 

1947 births
2020 deaths
Ice hockey people from Moscow
HC CSKA Moscow players
SKA Saint Petersburg players
Ice hockey players at the 1976 Winter Olympics
Olympic ice hockey players of the Soviet Union
Olympic gold medalists for the Soviet Union
Olympic medalists in ice hockey
Russian ice hockey players